HMS United (P44) was a Royal Navy U-class submarine built by Vickers-Armstrong at Barrow-in-Furness.  So far she has been the only ship of the Royal Navy to bear the name United.

Career
Whilst covering the Allied invasion of Sicily, United spotted the Italian transport submarine Remo on the surface. She launched four torpedoes, one of which hit the Remo amidships, sinking her within a few minutes. Only four survived, the three who were on the conning tower (amongst them the CO, Captain Vassallo), and Sergeant Dario Cortopassi who was able to come up from the control room. United also sank the Italian transport ship , which had already been damaged in a previous attack by motor torpedo boats.
 
She also damaged the Italian tanker Petrarca, and further damaged the Italian merchant Ravenna. The Ravenna had been grounded after air attack and a fire on 29 September 1942.  She also attacked the damaged Italian light cruiser , but missed her.  The Attilio Regolo had lost her bow due to an attack the previous day by HMS Unruffled.

United survived the war and was scrapped at Troon from 12 February 1946.

References

External links
 
 

 

British U-class submarines
Ships built in Barrow-in-Furness
1941 ships
World War II submarines of the United Kingdom